Bolshaya Ipelka is a massive shield volcano at the southern end of the Kamchatka Peninsula in Russia's Far East region. Bolshaya Ipelka is of Pleistocene age and formed west of the main volcanic zone in southern Kamchatka. The shield volcano is now inactive, having last erupted during the Pleistocene epoch. 

Bolshaya Ipelka is extensively eroded, having been dissected by deep valleys along its flanks that were formed as a result of glaciers flowing out from the summit during past glacial periods. The summit is the most severely eroded part of the original cone, which originally had a much higher elevation than its present . By contrast, the neighbouring Opala stratovolcano has an uneroded form and is still volcanically active, having last erupted about 300 years ago.

See also
List of volcanoes in Russia

References

Mountains of the Kamchatka Peninsula
Volcanoes of the Kamchatka Peninsula
Shield volcanoes of Russia
Pleistocene shield volcanoes
Inactive volcanoes